

History
Mes Soongoun Varzaghan Football Club was established on 1 May 2010 in Varzaghan, Iran. It is the team of the Mes Soongoun copper company. The team bought the licence of Shahin Ahvaz and began competitions in the 2nd Division in 2010. In their first year Mes Varzaghan finished 13th in group B and were relegated to the 3rd Division. The following season they were again promoted to the 2nd Division.
Melli Pooshan F.C. replaced for Mes Soongoun F.C. in Iran Football's 2nd Division 2014–15.

Season-by-Season
The table below shows the achievements of the club in various competitions.

See also
 Hazfi Cup
 Iran Football's 2nd Division 2014–15

Football clubs in Iran